Cyanogen bromide is the inorganic compound with the formula (CN)Br or BrCN.  It is a colorless solid that is widely used to modify biopolymers, fragment proteins and peptides (cuts the C-terminus of methionine), and synthesize other compounds.  The compound is classified as a pseudohalogen.

Synthesis, basic properties, and structure 
The carbon atom in cyanogen bromide is bonded to bromine by a single bond and to nitrogen by a triple bond (i.e. ).  The compound is linear and polar, but it does not spontaneously ionize in water.  It  dissolves in both water and polar organic solvents.

Cyanogen bromide can be prepared by oxidation of sodium cyanide with bromine, which proceeds in two steps via the intermediate cyanogen:
2 NaCN + Br2 -> (CN)2 + 2 NaBr

(CN)2 + Br2 -> 2 (CN)Br

When refrigerated the material has an extended shelflife. Like some other cyanogen compounds, cyanogen bromide undergoes an exothermic trimerisation to cyanuric bromide. This reaction is catalyzed by traces of bromine, metal salts, acids and bases.  For this reason, experimentalists avoid brownish samples.

Cyanogen bromide is hydrolyzed to release hydrogen cyanide and hypobromous acid
(CN)Br + H2O -> HCN + HOBr

Biochemical applications 
The main uses of cyanogen bromide are to immobilize proteins, fragment proteins by cleaving peptide bonds, and synthesize cyanamides and other molecules.

Protein immobilization 
Cyanogen bromide is often used to immobilize proteins by coupling them to reagents such as agarose for affinity chromatography. Because of its simplicity and mild pH conditions, cyanogen bromide activation is the most common method for preparing affinity gels. Cyanogen bromide is also often used because it reacts with the hydroxyl groups on agarose to form cyanate esters and imidocarbonates. These groups are reacted with primary amines in order to couple the protein onto the agarose matrix, as shown in the figure. Because cyanate esters are more reactive than are cyclic imidocarbonates, the amine will react mostly with the ester, yielding isourea derivatives, and partially with the less reactive imidocarbonate, yielding substituted imidocarbonates.

The disadvantages of this approach include the toxicity of cyanogen bromide and its sensitivity to oxidation. Also, cyanogen bromide activation involves the attachment of a ligand to agarose by an isourea bond, which is positively charged at neutral pH and thus unstable. Consequently, isourea derivatives may act as weak anion exchangers.

Protein cleavage 
Cyanogen bromide hydrolyzes peptide bonds at the C-terminus of methionine residues. This reaction is used to reduce the size of polypeptide segments for identification and sequencing.

Mechanism 

The electron density in cyanogen bromide is shifted away from the carbon atom, making it unusually electrophilic, and towards the more electronegative bromine and nitrogen. This leaves the carbon particularly vulnerable to attack by a nucleophile, and the cleavage reaction begins with a nucleophilic acyl substitution reaction in which bromine is ultimately replaced by the sulfur in methionine. This attack is followed by the formation of a five-membered ring as opposed to a six-membered ring, which would entail the formation of a double bond in the ring between nitrogen and carbon. This double bond would result in a rigid ring conformation, thereby destabilizing the molecule. Thus, the five-membered ring is formed so that the double bond is outside the ring, as shown in the figure.

Although the nucleophilic sulfur in methionine is responsible for attacking BrCN, the sulfur in cysteine does not behave similarly. If the sulfur in cysteine attacked cyanogen bromide, the bromide ion would deprotonate the cyanide adduct, leaving the sulfur uncharged and the beta carbon of the cysteine not electrophilic. The strongest electrophile would then be the cyanide nitrogen, which, if attacked by water, would yield cyanic acid and the original cysteine.

Reaction conditions 
Cleaving proteins with BrCN requires using a buffer such as 0.1M HCl (hydrochloric acid) or 70% (formic acid). These are the most common buffers for cleavage. An advantage to HCl is that formic acid causes the formation of formyl esters, which complicates protein characterization. However, formic is still often used because it dissolves most proteins. Also, the oxidation of methionine to methionine sulfoxide, which is inert to BrCN attack, occurs more readily in HCl than in formic acid, possibly because formic acid is a reducing acid. Alternative buffers for cleavage include guanidine or urea in HCl because of their ability to unfold proteins, thereby making methionine more accessible to BrCN.

Note that water is required for normal peptide bond cleavage of the iminolactone intermediate. In formic acid, cleavage of Met-Ser and Met-Thr bonds is enhanced with increased water concentration because these conditions favor the addition of water across the imine rather than reaction of the side chain hydroxyl with the imine. Lowered pH tends to increase cleavage rates by inhibiting methionine side chain oxidation.

Side reactions 
When methionine is followed by serine or threonine, side reactions can occur that destroy the methionine without peptide bond cleavage. Normally, once the iminolactone is formed (refer to figure), water and acid can react with the imine to cleave the peptide bond, forming a homoserine lactone and new C-terminal peptide. However, if the adjacent amino acid to methionine has a hydroxyl or sulfhydryl group, this group can react with the imine to form a homoserine without peptide bond cleavage. These two cases are shown in the figure.

Organic synthesis 
Cyanogen bromide is a common reagent in organic synthesis. As stated earlier, the reagent is  prone to attack by nucleophiles such as amines and alcohols because of the electrophilic carbon. In the synthesis of cyanamides and dicyanamides, primary and secondary amines react with BrCN to yield mono- and dialkylcyanamides, which can further react with amines and hydroxylamine to yield guanidines and hydroxyguanidines. In the von Braun reaction, tertiary amines react with BrCN to yield disubstituted cyanamides and an alkyl bromide. Cyanogen bromide can be used to prepare aryl nitriles, nitriles, anhydrides, and cyanates. It can also serve as a cleaving agent. 
Cyanogen bromide is used in the synthesis of 4-methylaminorex ("ice") and viroxime.

Toxicity, storage, and deactivation 
Cyanogen bromide can be stored under dry conditions at 2 to 8 °C for extended periods.

Cyanogen bromide is volatile, and readily absorbed through the skin or gastrointestinal tract.  Therefore, toxic exposure may occur by inhalation, physical contact, or ingestion.  It is acutely toxic, causing a variety of nonspecific symptoms.  Exposure to even small amounts may cause convulsions or death. LD50 orally in rats is reported as 25–50 mg/kg.

The recommended method to deactivate cyanogen bromide is with sodium hydroxide and bleach. The aqueous alkali hydroxide instantly hydrolyzes (CN)Br to alkali cyanide and bromide. The cyanide can then be oxidized by sodium or calcium hypochlorite to the less toxic cyanate ion. Note that deactivation is extremely exothermic and may be explosive.

References

Further reading

External links 
 
 

Bromine compounds
Triatomic molecules
Cyano compounds
Nonmetal halides
Blood agents
Lachrymatory agents
Pseudohalogens